Ángel Pulido Fernández (1852–1932) was a Spanish physician, publicist and Liberal politician, who stood out as prominent philosephardite during the Restoration.

Biography 
Born on 2 February 1852 in the calle de las Infantas, Madrid, to a humble Catholic family of Asturian origin. He took studies in Medicine during the Sexenio Democrático (1868–1874).

He vowed to rebuild the links between and the Sephardi Jews, descendant of those expelled from the Iberian Peninsula in the late 15th century. He coined the expression españoles sin patria (Spaniards without a homeland) to refer to Sephardi Jews. His brand of Philosephardism, marked by a racialist approach, was not exempt, not unlike other philosephardists, from a certain degree of islamophobia, and also stressed the superiority of Sephardi Jews over Ashkenazim. Aside from the pro-Sephardi cause, he also campaigned for humanization of the death penalty, for the professionalization of veterinarians, in favour of blind people and in favour of conscription.

He became a member of the National Royal Academy of Medicine. Elected Senator by the Academy of Medicine in 1899, and later in 1903 by the University of Salamanca, Pulido became a Senator for life in 1910.

He died on 4 December 1932.

References

Bibliography  
 
 
 
 

1852 births
1932 deaths
Members of the Senate of Spain
Philosephardism in Spain
19th-century Spanish physicians
20th-century Spanish physicians
Spanish people of Asturian descent
People from Madrid